Pocrí may refer to:
 Pocrí, Coclé,  a corregimiento in Coclé Province, Panama
 Pocrí, Los Santos, capital of the Pocrí District, Los Santos province, Panama
 Pocrí District, a district of Los Santos Province, Panama